The Crying Tree is the second and final studio album by Boston, Massachusetts–based alternative country band Blood Oranges. It was released in 1994 on the East Side Digital label, and was produced by Eric Ambel.

Critical reception

Scott Schinder of Trouser Press wrote that the Blood Oranges "really blossom" on the Crying Tree, adding that "[Jimmy] Ryan contributes fine, rollicking workouts like "Halfway 'Round the World" and "Titanic," but the real revelation here is the dusky-voiced [Cheri] Knight, whose four songs include the epic "Crying Tree" and the heart-rending ballad "Shadow of You."" In 2013, Darryl Smyers called the album "...an alt-country gem waiting to be rediscovered."

Track listing
	Halfway 'Round The World	
	Miss It All	
	Hell's Half Acre	
	Bridges	
	Crying Tree	
	Sally	
	Shadow Of You	
	Handle Breaks	
	This Old Town	
	On The Run	
	Titanic	
	Hinges	
	Shine

References

1994 albums
Blood Oranges albums
Roots rock albums
Albums produced by Eric Ambel